Dol Guldur is the third studio album by the Austrian black metal band Summoning. It was released in 1997, through Napalm Records.

Background 

All lyrics are written by P. K. of the black metal band Abigor apart from those by J. R. R. Tolkien, who is even credited in the album booklet.

The final track, "Over Old Hills", is based on the song "Trapped and Scared" from Protector's solo project, Ice Ages' debut album "Strike the Ground".

The album's cover was adapted from 'Middle Earth', a painting by Roger Garland, and from a picture of the Ottenstein reservoir in the Austrian Waldviertel, showing the ruins of Lichtenfels Castle.

Track listing

Credits 

 Protector – vocals, guitar, keyboards
 Silenius – vocals, keyboards
 P. K. – lyrics

References

External links 

 Dol Guldur at AllMusic

1997 albums
Summoning (band) albums
Napalm Records albums